Kunturi (Aymara for condor, Hispanicized spelling Condori) is a mountain in the Arequipa Region in the Andes of Peru, about  high. It is situated in the Arequipa Province, Tarucani District. Kunturi lies south of the El Fraile dam, between Qiñwani (Quenuani) in the northeast and Pukasaya in the southwest.

References 

Mountains of Peru
Mountains of Arequipa Region